Planodasyidae is a family of worms belonging to the order Macrodasyida.

Genera:
 Crasiella Clausen, 1968
 Megadasys Schmidt, 1974
 Planodasys Rao, 1970

References

Gastrotricha